Mahendra Singh may refer to:

Mahendra Singh of Patiala (1852–1876), Maharaja of Patiala
Mahendra Singh Sodha (born 1932), Indian physicist
Mahendra Singh Tikait (1935–2011), Indian leader of farmers
Mahendra Pal Singh (born 1940), Indian lawyer
Mahendra Singh Mewar (born 1941), Indian politician from Udaipur
Mahendra Singh Pal (born 1949), Indian politician from Uttar Pradesh
Mahendra Singh, Indian soldier, recipient of Kirti Chakra and Sena Medal
Mahendra Singh Dhoni (born 1981), Indian cricketer
Mahendra Kumar Singh, Indian politician from Uttar Pradesh